Svein-Erik Bjerkrheim (born 9 April 1971) is a Norwegian schoolteacher and handball player.

He is married to handball player Susann Goksør Bjerkrheim. Bjerkrheim made his debut on the Norwegian national team in 1991, and played 85 matches for the national team between 1991 and 2003. He competed at the 1999 World Men's Handball Championship.

References

1971 births
Living people
Norwegian male handball players